That's Fats: A Tribute to Fats Domino is a 1996 tribute album to Fats Domino, released by Capitol Records, and being a collection of existing cover versions by various artists of songs made popular by Fats Domino.  Three Fats Domino performances are also included in the collection.

Track listing and performer credits

"The Fat Man"  Fats Domino
"All by Myself"  Johnny Burnette
"I'm in Love Again"  Ricky Nelson
"Sick and Tired"  Chris Kenner
"Please Don't Leave Me"  The Four Lovers
"Let the Four Winds Blow"  Roy Brown
"I Can't Go On (Rosalie)"  Dion & the Belmonts
"Honey Chile"  Dave Bartholomew
"Ain't That a Shame"  Fats Domino
"Blue Monday"  The Crickets
"Going to the River"  Johnny Rivers
"I Want to Walk You Home"  Sandy Nelson
"I'm Ready"  The Band
"What a Price" George Thorogood & the Destroyers
"Going Home Tomorrow"  Dr. John
"Ain't That a Shame"  Cheap Trick
"Big Fat (The Fat Man)"  Canned Heat
"I'm Walkin'"  Fats Domino
"Dedicated to Domino"  Al Robinson

Other credits

Bruce Harris Executive Producer
David Eno Project Coordinator
Steve Kolanjian Liner Notes, Compilation Producer
Ron Furmanek Remixing, Compilation Producer, Research
Kevin Reeves Remixing, Digital Remastering
Henry Marquez Art Direction
Randall Martin Design

References 

1996 compilation albums
Fats Domino tribute albums
Capitol Records compilation albums